EvoTV is a range of digital media players developed by Amkette that brings internet and web2.0 features to the television.  EvoTV was envisioned to be a substitute to the growing range of Smart TVs in the market. Instead of replacing complete television sets to get Internet-based features users could just connect an EvoTV and get the same features at a much lower cost. EvoTV is based on the Android operating system, can connect to the internet wirelessly, and can stream local, network and internet media and audio files. Once connected users can access Android Playstore Apps using EvoTV on their television. The first EvoTV was launched in the middle of 2012 and received many positive reviews and awards. In 2013 Amkette EvoTV won the NDTV Gadget Award for the Best Consumer Electronic. In 2014 two news versions of EvoTV were introduced bringing the total variants to five.

As of 2022 the Web site evotv.amkette.com was dead, and the search term "EvoTV" found no matches on the Amkette Web site.

2014 models 
With the continuing demand for EvoTV, two new models were introduced in May 2014 - EvoTV Media Center and Android Central. These were focused towards online and offline media consumption.

Features

EvoView - Is the user interface which allows customization of the home screen for applications, videos, and weblinks.

EvoRemote - is a feature packed remote control which has gathered much praise as being an intuitive and advanced method to interact with EvoTV and access all the features available on it. It comes with a touch sensitive button to control the movement of the EvoTV pointer.

MyYTViewer - is an application that allows creation of live groups based on various criteria such as channels, category, terms and more for video from YouTube.

Motion Gaming - allows users to play games with the motion of the remote control.

EvoTV XL

In December 2012 EvoTV XL a next generation EvoTV device was launched and received many positive reviews and awards. It supports better hardware specifications and Android 4.0.1 (ICS). Boxtv.com, an online media steaming service has made a custom application for EvoTV. EvoTV XL is also XBMC enabled.

Reviews

EvoTV variants

Similar devices

EvoTV has most commonly been compared to Smart TVs, Amazon Fire TV, Apple TV, and Roku.

Negative feedback
Some tech jourlists deemed the first generation EvoTV to have a sluggish user interface which reduced the overall experience. Others have criticized the use of Android Gingerbread as being outdated. These issues have been corrected in the second generation EvoTV XL

See also
Digital media player
Comparison of set-top boxes

References

Streaming television
Digital media players
Television technology
Streaming media systems
Android (operating system) devices
Digital television
Interactive television
Products introduced in 2012

uz:EVOtv